The New Orleans mayoral election of 1965 resulted in the re-election of Victor Schiro to his second full term as Mayor of New Orleans.  No runoff was needed, as Schiro received over 50% of the vote. Elections were held on November 6.

Results 
Democratic Party Primary, November 6, 1965

Gerald J. Gallinghouse withdrew before the primary to endorse Fitzmorris.

References 

 Orleans Parish Democratic Executive Committee. Mayoralty: First and Second Democratic Primary Elections, 1965.

Mayoral elections in New Orleans
New Orleans
1965 Louisiana elections